North House, or variations such as North Cottage, may refer to:

in England
 North Cottage, Shoreham-by-Sea, England, a Grade II listed building in the District of Adur

in the United States 
 Pforzheimer House (Harvard College), formerly named North House, a residential house at Harvard University, Cambridge, Massachusetts
 Townsend North House, Vassar, Michigan, listed on the National Register of Historic Places (NRHP) in Tuscola County
 James North House, Labadie, Missouri, listed on the NRHP in Franklin County
 North Mansion and Tenant House (also known as Gen. William North House), Duanesburg, New York, NRHP-listed
 Benjamin D. North House, Middlefield, New York, NRHP-listed
 John A. North House, Lewisburg, West Virginia, NRHP-listed

See also
North Hall (disambiguation)